Emily Blunt is a British actress. She began her career as a teenager on the British stage, appearing alongside Judi Dench in a West End production of The Royal Family in 2001. Her first screen appearance was in the television film Boudica (2003), and she made her film debut with the lead role of a teenager exploring her homosexuality in Paweł Pawlikowski's drama My Summer of Love (2004). For playing the titular role of an emotionally troubled young woman in the BBC television film Gideon's Daughter (2006), Blunt won the Golden Globe Award for Best Supporting Actress – Series, Miniseries or Television Film. In the same year, she gained wider recognition for playing a fashion editor's assistant in the American comedy The Devil Wears Prada, earning a nomination for the BAFTA Award for Best Actress in a Supporting Role.

Following this breakthrough, Blunt went on to play lead roles in several films, including the period drama The Young Victoria (2009), the science fiction romance The Adjustment Bureau (2011), and the romance Salmon Fishing in the Yemen (2011). In 2014, she starred as a hardened sergeant in the action film Edge of Tomorrow, her highest-grossing release, and as the Baker's Wife in the musical fantasy Into the Woods. She went on to gain praise for playing a principled FBI agent in the crime film Sicario (2015) and an alcoholic in the thriller The Girl on the Train (2016); the latter earned her a nomination for the BAFTA Award for Best Actress in a Leading Role. In 2018, she starred in the critically acclaimed horror film A Quiet Place, directed by her husband John Krasinski, and in the musical fantasy Mary Poppins Returns, in which she played the title character. The former earned her the Screen Actors Guild Award for Best Supporting Actress. She has since starred in the sequel A Quiet Place Part II, the adventure film Jungle Cruise (both 2021), and the western television miniseries The English (2022).

Alongside her screen work, Blunt has provided her voice to several animated films, including Gnomeo & Juliet (2011) and its sequel Sherlock Gnomes (2018). She has also narrated the audiobook Sum: Forty Tales from the Afterlives in 2010, and recorded songs for the soundtrack of her films Into the Woods, My Little Pony: The Movie, and Mary Poppins Returns.

Film

Television

Stage

Radio

Audiobook

Web series

Discography

See also 
List of awards and nominations received by Emily Blunt

Notes

References

External links 

Actress filmographies
British filmographies